Gavin Clinch (born ) is a former Ireland international rugby league footballer who played as a  in the 1990s and 2000s.

Clinch played at representative level for Ireland, and at club level for Cronulla-Sutherland Sharks, Penrith Panthers, St. George Dragons, Halifax (two spells), Wigan Warriors, Huddersfield-Sheffield Giants, and Salford City Reds.

Gavin Clinch moved to Halifax at the beginning of 1998's Super League III season and was that year selected in the Super League Dream Team. He later won international caps for Ireland while at Huddersfield-Sheffield Giants, and Halifax 2000–2001 1-cap plus 1 as substitute.

References

External links
Statistics at wigan.rlfans.com

1974 births
Living people
Australian rugby league players
Place of birth missing (living people)
Ireland national rugby league team players
Halifax R.L.F.C. players
Huddersfield Giants players
Penrith Panthers players
Salford Red Devils players
St. George Dragons players
Wigan Warriors players
Rugby league five-eighths
Rugby league halfbacks
Cronulla-Sutherland Sharks players